The 1948 Cleveland Indians season was the 48th in franchise history. When the regular season resulted in a first place tie, the Indians won a one-game playoff against the Boston Red Sox to advance to the World Series. Cleveland won the championship by defeating the Boston Braves 4 games to 2 for their first World Series win in 28 years. The Sporting News ranked the 1948 Indians the 9th-best team ever.

It was reported years later that  teammates Bob Feller and Bob Lemon devised a plan in August to help relay signs to Indian batters that involved a telescope mounted on a tripod (which Feller brought from the war) that was hidden on the scoreboard of Municipal Stadium.

With the Chicago Cubs' 2016 World Series championship, which ironically was over Cleveland, being their first since 1908, the Indians now own the longest active world championship drought in Major League Baseball and the second-longest of any of the big four American sports leagues. Only the National Football League's Arizona Cardinals franchise owns a longer active world championship drought of the big four American sports leagues, having not won a world championship since 1947.

This memorable season was the first to be broadcast on television in the Cleveland area on WEWS-TV.

Off-season
In the 1947–48 off-season, owner Bill Veeck signed recent St. Louis Browns manager Muddy Ruel as a coach to join player-manager Lou Boudreau and coach Bill McKechnie, the latter who was also a long-time manager.

Player transactions:
 November 17, 1947: Pete Milne was drafted from the Indians by the New York Giants in the 1947 minor league draft.
 December 9, 1947: Catfish Metkovich and $50,000 were traded by the Indians to the St. Louis Browns for Johnny Berardino.
 January 27, 1948: Ralph Weigel was traded by the Indians to the Chicago White Sox for Thurman Tucker.
 Prior to 1948 season (exact date unknown)
Lee Wheat was signed as an amateur free agent by the Indians.
Bill Upton was signed as an amateur free agent by the Indians.

Regular season
Boudreau became the first shortstop in the history of the American League to win the MVP Award.

Season standings

Record vs. opponents

Notable transactions
 April 20, 1948: Catfish Metkovich was returned to the Indians by the St. Louis Browns. The Indians sent $15,000 to the St. Louis Browns as compensation.(Date given is approximate. Exact date is uncertain.)
 May 6, 1948: Catfish Metkovich, Les Webber and cash were traded by the Indians to the Oakland Oaks for Will Hafey (minors).
 June 15, 1948: Bill Kennedy and $100,000 were traded by the Indians to the St. Louis Browns for Sam Zoldak.
 July 7, 1948: Satchel Paige was signed as a free agent by the Indians.

Satchel Paige
The Indians made baseball history on July 9. In a game against the St. Louis Browns, with the Browns leading the Indians, 4–1, in the bottom of the fourth inning, Boudreau pulled his starting pitcher, Bob Lemon and brought Negro leagues legend Satchel Paige into the game.

The first batter Paige faced was Browns first baseman Chuck Stevens. Paige did not yet know the signs, and Stevens lined a single into left field. Jerry Priddy bunted Stevens over to second. Next was Whitey Platt, and Paige threw an overhand server for a strike and one sidearm for another strike. Paige then threw his "Hesitation Pitch", which puzzled Platt and led him to throw his bat forty feet up the third base line. Browns manager Zack Taylor bolted from the dugout to talk to umpire Bill McGowan about the pitch. Taylor argued that it was a balk, but McGowan let it stand as a strike. Paige got Al Zarilla to fly out and the inning was over. In the next inning, Paige gave up a leadoff single to Dick Kokos. His catcher simplified his signals, and Paige got Roy Partee to hit into a double play. Larry Doby, the player who broke the American League's color barrier, pinch hit for Paige the following inning.

Paige got his first big league victory on July 15. This was accomplished the night after he pitched in an exhibition game against the Brooklyn Dodgers in front of 65,000 people in Cleveland's Municipal Stadium. The victory came against the Philadelphia Athletics at Shibe Park. The Indians were up 5–3 with the bases loaded in the sixth inning of the second game of a double header. Paige got Eddie Joost to fly out to end the inning. Unfortunately, he gave up two runs the next inning when Ferris Fain doubled and Hank Majeski hit a home run. Paige buckled down and gave up only one more hit the rest of the game, getting five of the next six outs on fly balls. Doby and Ken Keltner would hit home runs in the ninth to give the Indians an 8–5 victory.

On August 3, the Indians were one game behind the Athletics. Boudreau started Paige against the Washington Senators in Cleveland. The 72,562 people that saw the game set a new attendance record for a major league night game. Paige showed his nervousness as he walked two of the first three batters and then gave up a triple to Bud Stewart to fall behind 2–0. By the seventh, the Indians were up 4–2 and held on to give Paige his second victory.

Paige's next start was against the Chicago White Sox at Comiskey Park. 51,013 people paid to see the game, but many thousands more stormed the turnstiles and crashed into the park, overwhelming the few dozen ticket-takers.  Paige pitched a complete game shutout, beating the White Sox 5–0.

By August 20, the Indians were in a heated pennant race. Coming into the game against the White Sox, Bob Lemon, Gene Bearden and Sam Zoldak had thrown consecutive shutouts to run up a thirty-inning scoreless streak, eleven shy of the big league record. For this game, played in Cleveland, 78,382 people came to see Paige. This was a full 6,000 more people than the last time that the night attendance record was set. Paige went the distance again, giving up two singles and one double for his second consecutive three-hit shutout. Paige now had a 5–1 record and a low 1.33 ERA.

American League Playoff
At the end of the season, Cleveland and the Boston Red Sox were tied for first place. This led to the first-ever one-game playoff in the American League. The Indians defeated the Red Sox 8–3 in the 1948 playoff game. Knuckleballer Gene Bearden was given the start for the Indians. Red Sox manager Joe McCarthy picked pitcher Denny Galehouse, who had an 8–7 pitching record.

Ken Keltner contributed to the victory with his single, double, and 3-run homer over the Green Monster in Fenway Park in the 4th inning. The Indians moved on to the 1948 World Series against the Boston Braves. Later, McCarthy said he had no rested arms and that there was no else who could pitch. Mel Parnell and Ellis Kinder claimed that they were both ready to pitch.

Opening Day Lineup

Roster

Player stats

Batting

Starters by position
Note: Pos = Position; G = Games played; AB = At bats; H = Hits; Avg. = Batting average; HR = Home runs; RBI = Runs batted in

Other batters
Note: G = Games played; AB = At bats; H = Hits; Avg. = Batting average; HR = Home runs; RBI = Runs batted in

Pitching

Starting pitchers
Note: G = Games pitched; IP = Innings pitched; W = Wins; L = Losses; ERA = Earned run average; SO = Strikeouts

Other pitchers
Note: G = Games pitched; IP = Innings pitched; W = Wins; L = Losses; ERA = Earned run average; SO = Strikeouts

Relief pitchers
Note: G = Games pitched; W = Wins; L = Losses; SV = Saves; ERA = Earned run average; SO = Strikeouts

1948 World Series 

On October 9, 1948, a new World Series single game attendance record was set during Game 4. 81,897 fans packed Cleveland Stadium but one day later, that record was broken during Game 5. 86,288 fans attended the game.

Satchel Paige appeared in Game 5 for the Indians, becoming the first black pitcher to pitch a game in World Series history. He pitched for two-thirds of an inning in Game Two while the Indians were trailing the Boston Braves, giving up a sacrifice fly to Warren Spahn, got called for a balk and struck out Tommy Holmes.

AL Cleveland Indians (4) vs. NL Boston Braves (2)

Game 1
October 6, 1948, at Braves Field in Boston, Massachusetts

Game 2
October 7, 1948, at Braves Field in Boston, Massachusetts

Game 3
October 8 at Cleveland Municipal Stadium in Cleveland, Ohio

Game 4
October 9, 1948, at Cleveland Municipal Stadium in Cleveland, Ohio

Game 5
October 10, 1948, at Cleveland Municipal Stadium in Cleveland, Ohio

Game 6
October 11, 1948, at Braves Field in Boston, Massachusetts

Awards and honors
 Lou Boudreau, American League MVP
 Lou Boudreau, Associated Press Athlete of the Year
 Team ERA of 3.22, lowest in MLB for 1948
 Team fielding percentage of .982, highest in MLB for 1948
 Team batting average of .282, highest in MLB for 1948
All-Star Game
 Lou Boudreau, Shortstop, starter
 Joe Gordon, Second baseman, starter
 Ken Keltner, Third baseman, starter
 Bob Feller, reserve
 Bob Lemon, reserve

Farm system

Notes

References
1948 Cleveland Indians team at Baseball-Reference
1948 Cleveland Indians team at baseball-almanac.com
1948 World Series at Baseball-Reference

Cleveland Indians seasons
Cleveland Indians season
American League champion seasons
World Series champion seasons
Cleveland Indians